The Venezuelan fish-eating rat (Neusticomys venezuelae) is a species of a Rodent in the Cricetidae family. It is found in Guyana and Venezuela.

References

Musser, G. G. and M. D. Carleton. 2005. Superfamily Muroidea. pp. 894–1531 in Mammal Species of the World a Taxonomic and Geographic Reference. D. E. Wilson and D. M. Reeder eds. Johns Hopkins University Press, Baltimore.

Neusticomys
Mammals described in 1929
Taxonomy articles created by Polbot